Adelbert Hans Gustav Niemeyer (15 April 1867 in Warburg – 21 July 1932 in Munich) was a German painter, craftsman and architect.

1867 births
1932 deaths
19th-century German painters
German male painters
20th-century German painters
20th-century German male artists
20th-century German architects
Artists from North Rhine-Westphalia
19th-century German male artists
People from Warburg